2018 in Indian sports describes the year's events in Indian sport. The main highlight for this year for India is the 2018 Winter Olympics in Pyeongchang and the 2018 Commonwealth Games in Gold Coast.

Calendar by month

March

April

June

August

Sports Leagues in 2018

Domestic leagues

Multi-sport events

Year highlights
 Vidarbha beat Delhi by 9 wickets to win their maiden Ranji Trophy.
 Chennai Super Kings, under the captainship of Mahendra Singh Dhoni, won the Indian Premier League(IPL) 2018 against Hyderabad Sunrisers and won the championship in their comeback after 2 years.
 Hyderabad Hunters defeat Bengaluru Blasters 4-3 to claim their maiden Premier Badminton League title.
 India national blind cricket team claimed the 2018 Blind Cricket World Cup title by defeating Pakistan in the finals by 2 wickets.
 Indian national cricket team won the ODI Series against South Africa in South Africa in first in History.
 India national under-19 cricket team won the 2018 Under-19 Cricket World Cup held in New Zealand beating Australia in the Final.
 India competed in 2016 Pyeongchang Winter Olympics & Paralympics respectively.
 India competed at the 2018 Commonwealth Games Held in Gold Coast Australia and bagged 26 Golds, 20 Silvers and 20 Bronze Medals.
India competed at the 2018 Asian Games held in Jakarta-Palembang, Indonesia and bagged 15 Gold, 24 Silver and 30 Bronze Medals.
India defeated Iran 44-26 in the final to clinch the inaugural edition of the Dubai Kabaddi Masters tournament title.

References